The Chelkans (native name—Chalkandu, Shalkandu) are a small group of Turkic indigenous people of Siberia. They speak the Northern Altai Chelkan language. Those residing in Altai Republic are sometimes grouped together with the Altai ethnic group and those in Kemerovo Oblast are grouped with the Shors; however, they are recognized as a separate ethnic group within the list of indigenous small-numbered peoples of the North, Siberia and the Far East by ethnographers and the Resolution of the Government of the Russian Federation No. 255 dated March 24, 2000, and Russian Census (2002). But, during the 2010 census, they were again "united" with the Altaians. According to the 2010 census, there were 1,181 Chelkans in Russia.

History 
The Chelkans emerged from the mixing of Turkic clans with Ket, Samoyed, and other native Siberian groups. This was a process that began as early as the period when the Yenisei Kygryz dominated the region. The Mongols then ruled over the region and people from the 13th to 18th centuries. The Dzungars then briefly controlled the area until the Chelkans (along with other Altaians) submitted to the Russians.

Culture 
The Chelkans were originally hunters and animals living in the taiga were their main prey and were vital to the local subsistence economy. Around the 19th century, the Chelkans took up picking cedar nuts as a additional economic activity.

The Chelkans traditional dwellings included polygonal yurts made out of bark or log and topped with a conic bark roof. Other types of dwellings also included conic yurts made out of bark or perches.

Traditional Chelkan dress included short breeches, linen shirts, and single-breasted robes.

Religion 
Most modern Chelkans are Orthodox Christian. However, Burkhanism and shamanism is also found among the Chelkans.

References

External links 
 International Arctic Social Sciences Association, 2001
 The Chelkan Language page of Endangered Languages of Indigenous Peoples of Siberia

Altai people
Ethnic groups in Russia
Indigenous peoples of North Asia
Indigenous peoples of the Altai Republic
Indigenous small-numbered peoples of the North, Siberia and the Far East
Turkic peoples of Asia
Indigenous peoples in the Arctic